The Czech women's national ice hockey team represents Czech Republic at the International Ice Hockey Federation's IIHF World Women's Championships. The women's national team is controlled by Czech Ice Hockey Association. As of 2021, Czech Republic has 4,142 female players. The Czech women's national team is ranked 7th in the world.

Tournament record

Olympic Games

2022 – Finished 7th

World Championship
1999 – Finished 4th in Group B
2000 – Finished 7th in Group B
2001 – Finished 3rd in Division I
2004 – Finished 2nd in Division I
2005 – Finished 3rd in Division I
2007 – Finished 5th in Division I
2008 – Finished 3rd in Division I
2009 – Finished 5th in Division I (Demoted to Division II)
2011 – Finished 1st in Division II (Promoted to Division I)
2012 – Finished 1st in Division IA (Promoted to Top Division)
2013 – Finished 8th (Demoted to Division IA)
2014 – Finished 9th (Promoted to playoff)
2015 – Finished 9th (Promoted to Top Division)
2016 – Finished 6th
2017 – Finished 8th
2019 – Finished 6th
2020 – Cancelled due to the coronavirus pandemic
2021 – Finished 7th
2022 –

European Championship
1993 – Finished in 8th place (2nd in Group B)
1995 – Finished in 9th place (2nd in Group B)
1996 – Finished in 9th place (2nd in Groupe B)

Team

Current roster
Roster for the 2022 IIHF Women's World Championship.

Head coach: Carla MacLeod

Former head coaches
 Milan Koks, 1999–2000
 Jan Fidrmuc, 2001–2009
 Karel Manhart, 2009–2013
 Jiří Vozák, 2013–2017
 Petr Novák, 2018–2020
 Tomáš Pacina, 2020–2021

References

External links

IIHF profile

Women's national ice hockey teams in Europe
Ice hockey in the Czech Republic
1993 establishments in the Czech Republic
Ice hockey
Ice hockey clubs established in 1993